Mass Rapid Transit Corporation Sdn Bhd (abbreviated as MRT Corp or MRTC) is a Malaysian state-owned company and a corporate body established under the Ministry of Finance (Incorporation) Act 1957. MRT Corp is fully owned by the Minister of Finance (Incorporated).

It was set up to be the developer and asset owner of the Mass Rapid Transit project in Kuala Lumpur, the capital of Malaysia, under the government's move to restructure the city's public transport system.

The company was established in September 2011 and took over the ownership of the Klang Valley Mass Rapid Transit Project (KVMRT) in October 2011 from Prasarana Malaysia Berhad.

MRT Corp’s responsibilities include monitoring and tracking of construction of all elevated structures, stations and depots of the mass rapid transit project. It also monitors the underground works which involves tunneling and construction of underground stations. It is also responsible for the contracts which they are involved in.

Rationale

 (fully operational)
 (fully operational)
 (under planning)
Johor Bahru–Singapore Rapid Transit System (RTS Link) (construction started in 2020)

Service brands
The word "MRT" as a service brand will be carried on all MRT Corp's owned assets, consisting of trains, stations, buses, depots and buildings.
 Trains on the MRT Kajang Line are operated by Prasarana Malaysia Berhad subsidiary, Rapid Rail Sdn Bhd
 MRT Kajang Line feeder buses operated by Prasarana Malaysia Berhad subsidiary, Rapid Bus Sdn Bhd on 300 Units of Single Deck 10 Metre Completely-Knocked-Down (CKD) Diesel City Feeder Buses, of which 150 units are Scania buses while the remaining are Volvo buses. There are 3 new MRT feeder bus depots to be built at Jalan Sungai Sekamat Kajang, Seksyen U4 Shah Alam and the Desa Tun Razak Industrial Area.

References

External links
Mass Rapid Transit Corporation Sdn Bhd (MRT Corp)
Prasarana Malaysia Berhad (Prasarana)
Suruhanjaya Pengangkutan Awam Darat (SPAD)

2011 establishments in Malaysia
Government-owned companies of Malaysia
Privately held companies of Malaysia